Modern pentathlon at the 2018 Summer Youth Olympics was held from 12 to 16 October. The events took place at the Parque Polideportivo Roca and Tecnópolis in Buenos Aires, Argentina.

Qualification

Each National Olympic Committee (NOC) can enter a maximum of 2 competitors, 1 per each gender. As hosts, Argentina was given the maximum quota and a further 4, 2 in each gender was initially given to the Tripartite Commission. The remaining 42 places shall be decided in three stages; firstly four continental qualification tournaments held in 2017, second the 2018 World Youth A Championships and finally the Olympic Youth Pentathlon World Rankings. Should a nation qualify more than 1 athlete per gender the nation will be allowed to choose which athlete will compete.

Each athlete will compete in both the individual and mixed events. To be eligible to participate at the Youth Olympics athletes must have been born between 1 January 2000 and 31 December 2003.

Boys

* NOC must decide which athlete to send.

Girls

* NOC must decide which athlete to send.

Medal summary

Medal table

Events

References

External links
Official Results Book – Modern pentathlon

 
2018 Summer Youth Olympics events
Youth Summer Olympics
2018
Modern pentathlon competitions in Argentina